Germany was represented at the Eurovision Song Contest 2002 by Corinna May with the song "I Can't Live Without Music", written by Ralph Siegel and Bernd Meinunger. Corinna May had also entered the German National Final in 1999 and 2000. She had previously won the 1999 German Final before being disqualified when it was discovered that her winning song had already been released by another band. She also came 2nd in the 2000 German Final. At Eurovision 2002 Corinna May placed 21st.

Before Eurovision

Countdown Grand Prix 2002 
Germany's representative was chosen during a national final called 'Countdown Grand Prix 2002'. It was held on 22 February at the Ostseehalle in Kiel, hosted by Axel Bulthaupt and it was broadcast live on television. The winner was chosen in two rounds of televoting - after the first round, the top 3 songs were voted on again. Corinna May won the German National Final and represented Germany in Tallinn with her English-language song "I Can't Live Without Music".

At Eurovision

Voting

References

2002
Countries in the Eurovision Song Contest 2002
Eurovision
Eurovision